The Love Nest is a 1933 British comedy film directed by Thomas Bentley and starring Gene Gerrard, Camilla Horn and Nancy Burne.

Plot summary
On the eve of his own marriage, a man offers shelter to a runaway wife with whom he strikes up an unexpected bond.

Cast
 Gene Gerrard as George
 Camilla Horn as Fifi
 Nancy Burne as Angela
 Gus McNaughton as Fox
 Garry Marsh as Hugo
 Amy Veness as Ma
 Charles Paton as Pa
 Marian Dawson as Mrs. Drinkwater
 Judy Kelly as Girl

References

External links

1933 films
Films shot at British International Pictures Studios
1930s English-language films
Films directed by Thomas Bentley
1933 comedy films
British comedy films
Films set in England
British black-and-white films
1930s British films